The Wild Natives River is a river in Fiordland, New Zealand. It rises in the Franklin Mountains near Worsley Pass and flows westward into Hāwea / Bligh Sound.

See also
List of rivers of New Zealand

References

Rivers of Fiordland